Border Corridor Wildlife Refuge is a wildlife refuge, running through Guanacaste, Arenal Huetar Norte and Tortuguero Conservation Areas, in the northern part of Costa Rica running as a 2,000 metre wide strip of land along the border with Nicaragua. 

It was created in 1994 by decree 22962-MIRENEM, and there are no public facilities specifically for this refuge. The refuge contains a number of research programs of varying disciplines.

This refuge is partially disturbed but includes beaches, dry forests, wetlands, moist forests and coastal lagoons.

See also
 Korean Demilitarized Zone, for the efforts for a similar border corridor wildlife refuge.

References

Nature reserves in Costa Rica
Geography of Guanacaste Province